Agent Smith (later simply Smith) is a fictional character and the main antagonist of The Matrix franchise. He was primarily portrayed by Hugo Weaving in the first trilogy of films and voiced by Christopher Corey Smith in The Matrix: Path of Neo (2005), with Ian Bliss and Gideon Emery playing his human form, Bane, in the films and Path of Neo respectively. He also makes a cameo in the anime film The Animatrix (2003), voiced by Matt McKenzie. Jonathan Groff and Yahya Abdul-Mateen II portray Smith in The Matrix Resurrections (2021), the latter playing Morpheus in a dual role.

In 2008, Agent Smith was selected by Empire Magazine as the 84th Greatest Movie Character of All Time. In 2013, Weaving reprised the role for a General Electric advertisement. He is considered to be the archenemy of Neo who is the main protagonist of the story.

Overview
Smith began as an Agent,  an AI program in the Matrix programmed to keep order within the system by terminating human simulacra which would bring instability to the simulated reality, as well as any rogue programs that no longer serve a purpose to the Machine collective. To this end, Smith and his fellow Agents possess a number of superhuman attributes from their ability to bend the rules of the Matrix. Smith manifests his physical form by inhabiting and overwriting the simulated body of a human wired into the Matrix; by moving from body to body, he can reform himself if he is "killed" (which only kills the host body) and appear virtually anywhere. He can overcome the limitations of gravity and the human body, giving him speed and strength sufficient to dodge bullets flawlessly, punch through concrete with his bare hands, jump impossible distances, and easily recover from devastating physical assaults. He and other Agents wear dark green business suits with matching neckties, white dress shirts, and sunglasses with rectangular lenses. They use earpiece radios that allow them to communicate with each other instantaneously and perceive the actions of other humans wired into the Matrix via a type of shared consciousness. When Smith removes his earpiece during the first film, he is left unaware of the attack on the building in which he is holding Morpheus. Smith is armed in the first film with the Desert Eagle, chambered for high-caliber .50 AE ammunition, as is standard with all Agents within the Matrix.

At the end of the first film, Smith appears to have been deleted by Neo. However, in the sequels, Smith is revealed to have been linked to Neo, which enabled him to resist being sent to the Source – the Machines' mainframe, where obsolete or malfunctioning programs are deleted. No longer an Agent, Smith is liberated from the Machines' control and exists as a renegade program that manifests himself akin to a self-replicating computer virus compared to his original Agent-based ability to inhabit a single body wired into the Matrix. Smith gains the power to copy his physical form onto any entity in the Matrix by phasing his hand into their body and spreading a black liquid that transforms them into a copy of himself, resulting in an ever-growing army of Smiths connected by a single consciousness. By copying himself onto a human redpill in the process of disconnecting from the Matrix, Smith overwrites their consciousness and takes control of their body in the real world. This is seen when Smith takes over Bane's body in The Matrix Reloaded; however, he is repelled when he attempts to do the same to Morpheus and Neo. Smith's real power comes from his ability to absorb memories and powers from his victims, human and program alike, culminating in him taking over the Oracle and fighting Neo in the final battle of the Matrix series. Neo allows himself to be overwritten during the battle, thus giving the Machines an opportunity to delete Smith and return the Matrix and its inhabitants to normal.

Character history

The Matrix
In the first film, Smith is one of the three Agents sent to deal with Morpheus. After Neo is successfully removed from the Matrix, Smith arranges Morpheus' capture by bribing Cypher, a disillusioned member of Morpheus' crew, with reintegration into The Matrix. Upon his capture of Morpheus, he then attempts, to no avail, to get Morpheus to supply the codes to Zion's mainframe, eventually being forced to admit to Morpheus his personal motives of wishing to get away from the Matrix regarding his accessing its mainframe. Ironically, this has him missing key intel about Neo and Trinity's entry into Morpheus's holding area due to removing his earpiece briefly. When Neo manages to free Morpheus, Smith, after ordering the dispatch of Sentinels to the Nebuchadezzer, then interferes with Neo's escape, with Neo managing to put up a fight against Smith while the latter dominated the fight overall, and narrowly win by breaking free of Smith when the latter tried to force him to be run over by a train. However, he survived and proceeded alongside his fellow Agents engage in a lengthy cross-town chase. Shortly after Neo escapes the fight, Smith guns him down, having anticipated his destination. Neo revives, realizes his power as the One, and subsequently defeats Smith by entering his body and destroying the code from within.

The Matrix Reloaded
As a result of his contact with Neo from the first film, Smith is "unplugged" in the second film, no longer an Agent of the system but a "free man". This is signified by the lack of an earpiece, which he sends to Neo in an envelope as a message early in the film. His appearance has changed in the second film as well; his sunglasses now have an angular shape different from the Agents' oblong lenses, approximating the shape of the ones Neo wears. His suit and tie are now jet black, as opposed to the dark green tint from the first film. He still possesses the abilities of an Agent, but instead of being able to jump from one human to another, he is able to copy himself over any human or program in the Matrix through direct contact; this includes humans wired into the Matrix, non-Agent programs with human forms, redpills, and other Agents. Smith retains the memories and abilities, if any, of the one over which he copies himself. This ability is much like how a virus replicates, creating an ironic contrast with the first film, where Smith likens humanity to a virus. He also implies after Neo defeated his replacement agents Thompson, Jackson, and Johnson that Smith had existed during and was familiar with at least the fifth iteration of the Matrix and the events therein.

He makes the claim that Neo has set him free. However, he believes there is an unseen purpose that still binds him to Neo. He tries to copy his programming onto Neo, but when this fails, he and dozens of his clones attack him, forcing Neo to flee. Later, he and his clones try to stop Neo from reaching the machine mainframe, without success, although he nonetheless was successful in mortally wounding the Keymaker.

Smith copies himself onto Bane (Ian Bliss), a crew member of the Zion hovercraft Caduceus. While waiting to leave the Matrix with a message from The Oracle, Bane is attacked and overwritten by Smith, who then takes control of his body in the real world. Smith tests his control over the body by making Bane cut his own arm, in preparation for an assassination attempt on Neo that he quickly abandons. He later sabotages the Zion fleet's defense of the city by triggering one ship's electromagnetic pulse weapon too early, knocking out the other ships and allowing the Sentinels to overrun them.

The Matrix Revolutions

By the start of the third film, Smith has managed to copy himself over nearly every humanoid in the Matrix, giving him complete control over the "Core Network" (the underlying foundation of the inner workings of the Matrix), thus rendering him unstoppable even for the Machines themselves. The Oracle explains to Neo that he and Smith have become equal in power and that Smith is Neo's negative, a result of the Matrix's equation trying to balance itself. She tells Neo that Smith will destroy both the Matrix and the real world unless he is stopped. Smith soon assimilates the Oracle, gaining her power of foresight, and later manifests reality-bending powers equivalent to Neo's, such as the ability to fly. Meanwhile, in the real world, Bane (now under Smith's control) stows away on a ship being used by Neo and Trinity and tries to kill them both. Neo is blinded in the fight, but discovers that his new awareness of Machine technology allows him to perceive Smith's essence despite his destroyed eyes, allowing him to take Smith by surprise and kill him.

Near the climax of the film, Neo offers a deal with the Machines to get rid of Smith in exchange for Zion's safety, warning them that Smith is beyond their control and will eventually spread to the machine city, which will result in destruction of both mankind and machines. Knowing that Neo is right, the Machines agree to his terms and command all Sentinels attacking Zion to stand down and wait for orders. They later give Neo a connection to enter the Matrix to stop Smith on their behalf. Although the Matrix is now populated exclusively by Smith and his clones, the Smith that has obtained the Oracle's powers battles Neo alone; as he explains, he has foreseen his victory, and has no need for the help of his copies. The two are almost evenly matched as the fight begins, though Neo's combat abilities seem arguably superior to that of Smith, the latter attacking more out of brute force, rather than the technical skill he displayed in the first film. This lasts, until Neo is able to punch Smith strongly enough to slam him into the street at least 20ft away. As the fight continues, however, it becomes clear that Neo cannot win with his finite stamina against the tireless Smith, who begins to dominate Neo in the fight; by the end of the fight, he is able to brutally beat Neo into near defeat. In the midst of this battle, Smith explains to Neo his final nihilistic revelation: "It was your life that taught me the purpose of all life. The purpose of life is to end."

When Neo is near defeat, Smith demands to know why he continues to fight despite knowing he cannot win. Neo calmly responds, "Because I choose to" and is viciously pummeled by the enraged Smith as a result. Suddenly recognizing the scene from his prophecy, Smith is compelled to deliver the line he said in it: "I say.... Everything that has a beginning has an end, Neo." His own words confuse and frighten him and Neo realizes that he cannot overpower Smith and allows himself to be assimilated. Because Agent Smith has assimilated the anomaly (Neo), he is now directly connected to the Source through Neo and the machines are able to destroy all copies of his programming and reboot the Matrix without errors. The process apparently kills Neo, but it also purges the Matrix of Smith's infection, restoring all who had been infected to their original forms. Neo's body is carried away by the machines, and an uncertain peace is established between Zion and the machine world.

The Matrix Resurrections
Smith returns in The Matrix Resurrections, portrayed by Jonathan Groff. Despite his defeat at the end of The Matrix Revolutions, Smith survived destruction because Neo survived, though he lost the ability to copy himself over others, instead retaining only the abilities he possessed when he was an Agent. When the Analyst created the new version of the Matrix in order to keep Neo subdued so that the Machines' energy crisis could be solved, Smith took on a new shell in order to remain hidden. The Analyst, the creator of the new Matrix, found that Neo and Smith were bonded, and he chose to turn that bond into a 'chain': as Neo was suppressed, Smith was similarly suppressed, taking the role of Thomas Anderson's business partner, with an eye for the bottom line. Neo, in his original persona of Thomas Anderson, created a video game series based on his suppressed memories. After Neo reawakens to the Matrix, Smith regained his memories and attacked Neo, stating that he had come to like the freedom that he had been granted, and that Neo's potential return to unawareness threatened that freedom. Smith then appears at Simulatte, during Neo and Trinity's confrontation with the Analyst, saving them and aides them in fighting the Analyst's forces. Smith shoots the Analyst, causing him to vanish. Addressing Neo as Tom, Smith declares their unexpected alliance to be over, and states that the difference between the two of them is that "anyone could've been you whereas I've always been anyone." Smith then departs from his host body, leaving the man confused by the experience.

Neo also subconsciously created a version of Agent Smith in a modal influenced by his suppressed memories. This version of Agent Smith (portrayed by Yahya Abdul-Mateen II) was based upon Neo's memories of Morpheus amalgamated with his memories of the original Agent Smith, and was set free by Bugs, and became the new Morpheus.

In other media

The Animatrix
While it is unknown if it is actually him or merely just another Agent, as he was not directly named, an Agent with a heavy resemblance to Smith appears in The Animatrix film "Beyond", ordering a group of exterminators to capture Yoko and a group of kids and destroy a programming glitch in the form of an abandoned building that was causing whoever entered there to achieve complex athletic stunts without danger of serious injury or death. Earlier, he and the Agents perceived the abandoned building as an instability to the Matrix programming, and were already planning to eliminate it. Another Agent appears in "World Record," again resembling Smith, but wearing a trench coat over his usual suit and tie, where he and his fellow Agents attempt to stop a marathon runner named Dan from breaking a world record and disrupting his "signal," or connection to the Matrix, which means being able to escape from the Matrix. The Agents possess Dan's competitors and try to stop him from reaching the finish line and break his record. He appears in the end, reporting that Dan is a wheelchair user and thus unable to run or walk again, until he notices him trying to get up and repeatedly whisper "free," enraging him. However, when Dan instead falls on the floor and is helped up, the Agent is nowhere to be seen.

The Matrix Online
Despite his destruction at the end of the film series, Agent Smith (or at least the remnants of his programming) managed to return and made several appearances inside the movie's official continuation, the MMORPG The Matrix Online.

The first infection was noted in Machine mission controller Agent Gray, whose background information confirms that he was overwritten by Smith at some point during the timeline of the second and third films. This infection had somehow survived the reboot at the end of the third film and rose to the surface once again during chapter 1.2, The Hunt For Morpheus. The Agent, in both a storyline related mission and live event, showed signs of uncharacteristic speech and emotion and eventually led an assault against Zionist redpills declaring 'their stench unbearable any longer'. As a result of his actions the agent was apprehended by his fellow system representatives and scheduled for a 'thorough code cleansing'. He has shown no signs of direct infection since.   
    
Machine liaison officer DifferenceEngine, following a similar scenario to that of the previous Agent Gray infection, also took on the dialect and emotional characteristics of the famous exile agent. Instead of attacking redpills, this instance insisted on finding 'Mr. Anderson'. In the end, the human/machine head relations liaison, Agent Pace, was made aware of the program's infection and subsequent crusade; she proceeded to lock down his RSI and return his program to the Source for analysis. His subsequent fate is unknown.

The third victim of infection was the notorious bluepill Shane Black. This man was an unfortunate victim of the Smith Virus who, once infected, gained the ability to spread the code to others. This quickly led to a small scale outbreak, with several more bluepills becoming infected and joining forces in their hunt for power. He and the other infected were eventually cleansed and returned to their bluepill lives. Shane Black's troubles continued, as he was one of the bluepills recorded to have first witnessed Unlimited redpills practicing their newfound powers at the Uriah wharf. This triggered a resurgence of the memories formed during his Smith infection and he soon became volatile and insane. He is reported to have been mercifully killed shortly afterwards.

The most recent appearance of the Smith virus was during the third anniversary events. The virus manifested itself in the form of black-suited men (although they lacked the distinct likeness of Smith). As redpills began to fight back using specialist code from the Oracle, the virus vanished suddenly, stating that he had obtained a new and more dangerous form. The nature of this form was never revealed.

The Matrix: Path of Neo
The Matrix: Path of Neo, a video game covering the events of the entire film trilogy, features a different ending than that shown in The Matrix Revolutions, with a new final boss: the MegaSmith. The MegaSmith was used for gameplay reasons, because though the Wachowskis thought the martyr approach suitable for film, they also believed that in an interactive medium such as a video game (based upon the successful completion of goals), this would not work. So, this character was created to be the more appropriate "final boss" of Path of Neo, with the final battle described by the siblings as "A little Hulk versus Galactus action". The MegaSmith is composed of destroyed buildings, cars, and parts of the road, with the "spectator Smiths" standing around the crater and in the streets acting as the MegaSmith's muscles, resulting in Smith not only becoming the city's people, but the city itself.

After Neo knocks Smith into the crater in the level "Aerial Battle", Smith is sent flying through the ground and up through the street. As Neo relaxes, the surrounding Smiths walk away from the crater and begin assembling a gigantic, thirty-storey tall version of Smith from debris and vehicles. Neo flies up to face MegaSmith. After the fight, in which Neo significantly damages MegaSmith, Neo flies straight into MegaSmith's mouth, causing the Smiths throughout the Matrix to overload and explode. The player is then shown a short scene from The Matrix: Revolutions of the streets shining with light emanating from the destroyed Smiths.

The Lego Batman Movie (2017)
Agent Smith briefly appears in The Lego Batman Movie. He appears as one of the inmates of the Phantom Zone. Agent Smith and his clones appear surveilling Joker's vandalized Wayne Island, and later appear as one of the multiple enemies attacking the heroes. Smith's clones also appear as enemies in the Lego Batman Movie story pack for Lego Dimensions, adapting their role in the film.

His voice actor was uncredited.

Space Jam: A New Legacy (2021)
Agent Smith also appeared in the live-action/animated film Space Jam: A New Legacy, which was also distributed by Warner Bros. He is among the Warner Bros. Serververse inhabitants that watch the basketball game between the Tune Squad and the Goon Squad.

Personality
From the start it is evident that Agent Smith is significantly stronger, smarter, and more individualistic than the other Agents. While the other agents rarely act without consulting each other via their earpieces, to the point where they often finish each other's sentences, Smith is usually the one giving orders or using his earpiece to gather information for his own ends. Smith also appears to be the leader of other Agents in the first film, as he has the authority to launch Sentinel attacks in the real world. As with other Agents, Smith generally approaches problems through a pragmatic point of view but, if necessary, will also act with brute force and apparent rage, especially when provoked by Neo.

The earpieces represent some form of control mechanism by the machines. It is notable that when he is interrogating Morpheus, he sends the other agents from the room, then removes his earpiece, releasing himself from the link to the machines before expressing his opinion of humanity. Early in the second film, Smith's earpiece is sent to Neo in an envelope as a message from Smith, representing Smith's newfound freedom.

Agent Smith complains to Morpheus that the Matrix and its inhabitants smell disgusting, "if there is such a thing [as smell]". Smith has an open hatred of humans and their weakness of the flesh. He compares humanity to a virus; a disease organism that uncontrollably replicates and would inevitably destroy their environment were it not for the machine intelligences keeping them in check. Ironically, Smith eventually becomes a computer virus, multiplying until he has overrun the entire Matrix.

At the same time, Smith develops an animosity towards the Matrix itself, feeling that he is as much a prisoner of it as the humans he is tasked with controlling. He later develops an immense and increasingly open desire for the destruction of both mankind and machines.

He was also shown to be a nihilist, which eventually culminates in his statement that the purpose of life is to end, and crediting Neo's life for his determining this. During his final showdown with Neo, Smith angrily dismisses causes such as freedom, truth, peace, and love as simply human attempts to justify a meaningless and purposeless existence, and is completely unable to comprehend why Neo continues to fight him despite the knowledge that he cannot win.

The Wachowskis have commented that Smith's gradual humanization throughout The Matrix is a process intended to mirror and balance Neo's own increasing power and understanding of the machine world.

A writer at The Guardian commented that Smith seems to enjoy his job too much.

Portrayal
French actor Jean Reno was originally offered the role of Agent Smith in The Matrix, but he declined as he was at one point of his career in which he did not want to leave his native France, unwilling to move to Australia for a four-and-a-half months shooting. Hugo Weaving was ultimately cast as Smith. According to Weaving, he enjoyed playing the character because it amused him. He went to develop a neutral accent but with more specific character for the role. He wanted Smith to sound neither human nor robotic. He also said that the Wachowskis' voices influenced his voice in the film. When filming for The Matrix began, Weaving mentioned that he was excited to be a part of something that would extend him.

Following the announcement that Warner Bros. was planning a relaunch of The Matrix franchise, Hugo Weaving stated that he was open to reprising the role but only if the Wachowskis were involved. In 2019, The Matrix Resurrections was confirmed for a 2021 release, but Weaving would not be returning. Originally, Weaving was approached to reprise the role by Lana Wachowski, but he had scheduling conflicts with his involvement in Tony Kushner's theatrical adaptation of The Visit, leading Wachowski to conclude that the dates would not work and write him out from the film. Jonathan Groff was cast to replace Weaving in the role, with Yahya Abdul-Mateen II portraying a version of Smith inside a modal created by Neo.

Design

All Agents (other than Agents Perry and Pace from The Matrix Online game, and the modal version of Agent Smith that becomes Morpheus in The Matrix Resurrections) are white males, as opposed to the population of Zion, which contains people of many ethnic groups. Agents wear rectangular sunglasses, dark green business suits and neckties, and earpiece radios; after Smith loses his status as an Agent, his suit and tie turn black, his sunglasses take on an angled contour that approximates the rounded shape of the ones Neo wears, and he removes his earpiece and sends it to Neo. In contrast to the other Agents who show apathy toward the human race, Smith harbors an acute disgust with humanity. In the first film, he expresses a desire to leave the Matrix to escape its repulsive taint, and reasons that with Zion destroyed, his services will no longer be required, allowing him in some sense to 'leave' the Matrix. This at least partially explains his extreme antagonism towards Neo, who fights relentlessly to save Zion.

Other Agents have common English names like Brown, Jones, and Thompson. It was mentioned in the Philosopher Commentary on the DVD collection that the names of Smith, Brown, and Jones may be endemic to the system itself, demonstrating a very "robotic" mindset on the part of the Machines.

Neo's solitary role as the One is contrasted by Smith, who, by replicating himself, becomes "the many". When Neo asks the Oracle about Smith, the Oracle explains that Smith is Neo's opposite and his negative, the result of the Matrix's governing equations trying to balance themselves.

Unlike the other characters in The Matrix, Smith almost always refers to Neo as "Mr. Anderson". He calls him "Neo" only once in each part of the trilogy: the first time when he is interviewing Neo about his double life, the second when he is dropping off his earpiece for Neo, and the third when he is repeating a line of his vision to Neo.

Weaving said of the film series in 2003 that it was always going to be a trilogy, and that as Neo's nemesis, Smith was always going to be there, describing Smith as "more of a free agent" later on in the series.

Reception

Christopher Borrelli praised the writing of Smith, noting that the character "had all the good lines", and praising Weaving's portrayal of the character as showing "refreshingly nihilistic wit".

The character has been described as a 1950s "organization man", like Sergeant Joe Friday from Dragnet.

Hugo Weaving reprised the role of Smith in a parody used for a 2013 GE General Electric advertisement, in which multiple copies of him appear throughout a hospital and the advertisement concludes with Smith offering a choice of a red or blue lollipop to a boy.

See also
 Men in black
 Simulated reality

References

External links 

Fictional artificial intelligences
Fictional assassins
Film characters introduced in 1999
Fictional characters who can duplicate themselves
Fictional characters who can move at superhuman speeds
Fictional characters with superhuman strength
Fictional characters with spirit possession or body swapping abilities
Fictional computer viruses
Fictional government agents
Fictional gunfighters in films
Fictional mass murderers
Fictional nihilists
Fictional superorganisms
Fictional super soldiers
Martial artist characters in films
Science fiction film characters
The Matrix (franchise) characters
Advertising characters
Male film villains
Video game bosses
Action film villains
Male characters in advertising
Film supervillains